Sentimental Journey  is a 1946 American drama film directed by Walter Lang and starring John Payne and Maureen O'Hara.

Sentimental Journey was remade in 1958 as The Gift of Love, with Lauren Bacall and Robert Stack.

Plot
A Broadway producer Bill (John Payne) and his actress-wife Julie (Maureen O'Hara) are unable to have children. While strolling along the seashore, Julie finds an imaginative orphaned girl nicknamed Hitty (Connie Marshall) and decides to adopt her, a plan that Bill agrees to while distracted by dorks on his latest playscript. Shortly afterward, Julie dies of a heart attack, leaving Hitty in the care of the sullen Bill, who can't seem to connect with the girl. Guided and comforted by a ghostly vision of Julie, Hitty looks after Bill while he struggles to cope with Julie's death. At a Sunday afternoon party at the country house, Bill tells his friends to leave when Hitty describes her latest visitation from Julie. After Hitty runs away, Bill returns to the apartment and finds a recording of Julie's voice in which she describes Hitty as the "living link" that will always bind them. Bill goes to search for Hitty, finding her at the seashore where she first met Julie and rescuing her as the tide comes crashing in. Back at the apartment, Bill tucks Hitty into bed and informs his business manager that he must return to work now that he has a daughter to support.

Cast
 John Payne as William O. Weatherly
 Maureen O'Hara as Julie Beck Weatherly
 William Bendix as Uncle "Don" Donnelly
 Cedric Hardwicke as Dr. Jim Miller
 Glenn Langan as Judson
 Connie Marshall as Mehitabel "Hitty" Weatherly
 Mischa Auer as Gregory Petrovich Rogozhin
 Kurt Kreuger as Walt Wilson
 Trudy Marshall as Ruth
 Ruth Nelson as Mrs. McMasters

Reception
Bosley Crowther of The New York Times panned the film, calling it an "utterly mawkish picture ... a compound of hackneyed situations, maudlin dialogue and preposterously bad acting and is illogic all the way through." John McCarten of The New Yorker described the plot as "dismal" and reported that "not the merest trickle of a tear ran down my cheeks" despite the film being "plainly designed to break my heart." Variety declared it "the weeper to end all weepers," and despite considering the film to be "plodding and sometimes too premeditated," predicted it would be a box office hit. Harrison's Reports called it "a fairly good drama," though "thin and slow-moving."

Despite the less-than-glowing reviews from critics, the film was a box office success.

References

External links
 

 

 

1946 films
1946 drama films
20th Century Fox films
American black-and-white films
Films about adoption
Films based on short fiction
Films directed by Walter Lang
Films scored by Cyril J. Mockridge
American drama films
1940s English-language films
1940s American films